British Marine Air Navigation Co Ltd was a short-lived British airline operating flying boats across the English Channel in 1923 and 1924.  It merged with three other airlines in 1924 to form Imperial Airways.

Formation
British Marine Air Navigation Co Ltd was formed in 1923 in a joint venture between Supermarine and Southern Railway (owners of Southampton Docks), the Woolston base becoming Britain's first commercial flying boat base, with its own Customs and Immigration facilities.  The world's first scheduled passenger flying boat service began on 14 August 1923, with flights to Cherbourg, Le Havre and the Channel Islands.

Aircraft
Three Supermarine Sea Eagle flying boats, designed by Reginald Mitchell of later Spitfire fame, were purchased, and formed the inaugural fleet in 1923.

Imperial Airways 
On 31 March 1924, British Marine Air Navigation Co Ltd merged with Handley Page Transport, Instone Air Line, and Daimler Airway, to form Imperial Airways.

See also
List of aircraft of Imperial Airways
 List of defunct airlines of the United Kingdom

References

External links
 Imperial Airways enthusiasts' website

Airlines established in 1923
Defunct airlines of the United Kingdom
1923 establishments in the United Kingdom